Jonathan Nicholas Mark Potter (born 19 November 1963) is the managing director of the House of Suntory and Maison Courvoisier at Beam Suntory. He is a former field hockey player who was a member of the gold-winning Great Britain squad at the 1988 Summer Olympics in Seoul.

Following his retirement from hockey, he worked in the marketing departments for companies including KP Foods, Nestle, and Diageo.

Background
Potter was born Paddington, Greater London, and brought up in Slough, England. He attended Burnham Grammar School from 1976 to 1982, and represented Slough and Buckinghamshire Schools at soccer, the South of England Schoolboys, Berkshire and Buckinghamshire Minor Counties at cricket, as well as England Schoolboys at field hockey.

Potter graduated from Southampton University in 1986 with a BA (Hons) in geography, and attended Aston Business School (1986–87) to obtain his MBA.

He currently lives in Connecticut, US, with Tracy and their four children: Max, Hugo, Sophie and Lucy.

Field hockey career
Jon Potter went on to represent Great Britain and England at the highest levels in field hockey. He has competed in three Olympic Games, winning bronze in the 1984 Summer Olympics in Los Angeles and, four years later, gold at the 1988 Summer Games in Seoul.

In total Potter won 126 caps for Great Britain and 108 caps for England, scoring 41 international goals. He competed in 3 World Cups, winning a silver medal at the Hockey World Cup in 1986 in London, and in three European Cups, winning silver in Moscow (1987) and bronze in Paris (1991). He also captured two Champions Trophy medals with Great Britain – bronze in Karachi (1984) and silver in Perth (1985).

He has played club hockey for Hounslow Hockey Club, and won the HA Cup four times and the National League title twice, as well as leading the men's 1XI to European Cup Winners Cup victory in 1990.

He retired from international hockey in 1995 and was a board member of England Hockey Ltd from 2003 to 2007.

Business career
While representing his country at field hockey, Potter embarked on an international business career when in March 1988 he joined KP Foods, a Division of United Biscuits as a marketing assistant. He worked at KP Foods for 4 years before joining Nestle Rowntree in York, Yorkshire as a Marketing Controller overseeing various brands.  He moved with Nestle to the Prague, Czech Republic in May 1995 where he worked as a Marketing Director for Cokoladovny a Nestle/Danone joint venture.

Diageo
Jon left Nestle to join Guinness Brewing Ltd in December 1997 as European marketing and business development director responsible for the company's portfolio of brands across Continental Europe. 
Guinness and IDV merged to create a new company, Diageo, a premium drinks company that is the world's largest producer of spirits, where Jon Potter went on to hold various senior leadership roles within this newly merged company.

Between October 2000 and 2004, he was the global brand director for the Guinness brand before moving onto become first commercial director for Diageo Africa in July 2004 and then general manager Venture Africa and sales development between July 2005 and July 2007. In August 2007, Potter moved to the US initially to become the president, global vodka and rum portfolio and then, in August 2008 CMO for Diageo North America.

McKinney Rogers
After 13 years with Diageo, Jon left to join McKinney Rogers as a senior partner (Americas), global CMO and CMO for a venture capital startup. The company worked with many Fortune 500 companies on their global business execution and won the Queens award for enterprise in 2010.

Moet Hennessy

Jon joined Moet Hennessy USA as EVP of brands in July 2012 overseeing a portfolio of brands that includes Hennessy, Moet & Chandon, Veuve Clicquot, Dom Perignon, Krug, Belvedere Vodka and Glenmorangie.

The Boston Beer Company

Jon was appointed Boston Beer's first CMO, holding the position from 2016 to 2018. During this time, he launched Truly Hard Seltzer in the US and returned Boston Beer to double-digit growth.

Beam Suntory

Jon joined Beam Suntory in 2020 having previously consulted with the company in 2019. He was appointed managing director of Courvoisier in February and added the responsibility of managing director House of Suntory in May 2020.

Directorships
Potter has held various directorships during his career, including English Hockey Ltd (2003–2007), Orleans Infants School governor (2004 to 2007), Kenya Breweries (2004–2006), Sierra Leone Brewery Limited (2004 to 2007), Seychelles Breweries Ltd (2005 to 2007), Ketel One Worldwide (2008 to 2009), board member of the Ad Council (2009–2010), and Skyliners Synchronized Skating board member (2011 to 2014). He is currently an advisor to Nomadica (2019–present).

References

External links
 
 

1963 births
Living people
English male field hockey players
English Olympic medallists
Olympic field hockey players of Great Britain
British male field hockey players
Olympic gold medallists for Great Britain
Olympic bronze medallists for Great Britain
Field hockey players at the 1984 Summer Olympics
Field hockey players at the 1988 Summer Olympics
Field hockey players at the 1992 Summer Olympics
Alumni of the University of Southampton
Olympic medalists in field hockey
People educated at Burnham Grammar School
Medalists at the 1988 Summer Olympics
Medalists at the 1984 Summer Olympics
1990 Men's Hockey World Cup players